Philippine Navy FC is an association football club based in the Philippines under the administration of the Philippine Navy.
The club reached the quarter-finals of the 2010 UFL Cup where it was defeated by eventual Cup runner-up Philippine Air Force F.C. The club participated in Weekend Football League Elite 2018 and a regular participant in the annual AFP-PNP-PCG Olympics.
The Philippine Navy FC were crowned PFF National Football Champions in 1981–82, 1991, 1999 as NCR-B (PN & PAF selection) and 2005.
In the 1991 championship, the Navymen was under Coach Felix Servita Sr. who was also the coach of the San Beda Football Team that captured the NCAA crown in the same year.
The Phil. Navy FC was also champion of the Manila Football League in 1966, the de facto top flight football league in the country from 1930–1967.

The Navy football team started way back in the 60s, along with the other armed forces teams in the Philippines – the Philippine Army and Philippine Air Force football clubs. For the longest time, the various football teams of the Armed Forces of the Philippines were the best clubs in the country. They are the so-called "big three" of Philippine football. For three decades(the 1980s, 1990s, 2000s and the early 2010s), they have dominated the Philippine club footballing landscape, they won most of the major football tournaments in the country during that period. During the absence of a real professional football league, the armed forces teams were a means for many talented local footballers to extend their careers as they were feeders for the national team.

The Navy team official colors are blue and white.

Honors

National championship
 Winners (4): 1981–82, 1991, 2005 and
co winner in 1999 as NCR B selection of Navy and Air Force players

References 

1. https://en.wikipedia.org/wiki/Philippine_Air_Force_F.C.

2. https://int.soccerway.com/teams/philippines/navy-fc/18322/

3. http://www.findglocal.com/PH/Taguig/246749018784205/Philippine-Army-FC

4. https://en.wikipedia.org/wiki/List_of_football_clubs_in_the_Philippines

General
 

Football clubs in the Philippines
Sports teams in Metro Manila
Military sports clubs in the Philippines
Navy
Football club